Body shop or bodyshop may refer to:

 An automobile repair shop specialising in bodywork repairs
 The Body Shop, a chain of cosmetics stores
 Body shopping, a type of IT outsourcing
 The Body Shop, an interview segment by Jesse Ventura on 1980s WWE television broadcasts